Nitratireductor indicus is a Gram-negative, oxidase- and catalase-positive mobile bacteria from the genus of Nitratireductor which was isolated from deep-sea water of the Indian Ocean.

References

External links
Type strain of Nitratireductor indicus at BacDive -  the Bacterial Diversity Metadatabase

Phyllobacteriaceae
Bacteria described in 2011